Hands On! Tangrams is a puzzle game for Nintendo DS. It was released in North America on November 24, 2009.

Tangrams are an ancient set of Chinese moving puzzle pieces that today entertain and challenge people across the globe. Dating back to well before the 19th century, these seven simple shapes or “Tans” come together to form hundreds of different figures with multiple solutions. Tangrams have been used in classrooms around the world for generations to help teach basic math ideas.

Gameplay
There are more than 100 puzzles, grouped into 10 different themes, which come to life once solved.  The controls are very straightforward.  To move pieces, you simply drag them with your stylus.  To rotate, you press the L or R trigger.  To flip the pieces, you press Up on the d-pad.  There is a timer on each puzzle, and solving within a certain time frame earns you different colored stars.  These stars came easily at first, but once the player progresses through more levels, they became much harder to earn.

Reception

Hands On! Tangrams received mixed reviews from critics upon release. On Metacritic, the game holds a score of 68/100 based on 5 reviews, indicating "mixed or average reviews".

References

External links
 Island Officials
Hands On! Tangrams on GameSpy
Hands On! Tangrams on IGN
Hands On! Tangrams on IMDb

Puzzle video games
North America-exclusive video games
2009 video games
Nintendo DS games
Nintendo DS-only games
Video games developed in the United States